Great Bay is a rural locality on Bruny Island in the local government area of Kingborough in the Hobart region of Tasmania. The 2016 census determined a population of 57 for the state suburb of Great Bay. The Bruny Island Airport is located within the suburb of Great Bay.

History
Great Bay is a confirmed suburb/locality. In 1829 the Protector of Aborigines, George Augustus Robinson, set up an Aboriginal settlement near Great Bay (the body of water) on Bruny Island. It was here that Truganini first met Robinson.

Geography
The D'Entrecasteaux Channel forms the western boundary. This includes the southern half of Great Bay (the body of water).

Road infrastructure
The B66 route (Bruny Island Main Road) enters from the north and runs through to the south before exiting.

References

Localities of Kingborough Council
Towns in Tasmania
Bruny Island
Bays of Tasmania